The Gnjilane killings was the abduction, torture and mass murder of Kosovo Serb civilians in the town of Gnjilane by members of the KLA's Gnjilane group from June to October 1999, in the aftermath of the Kosovo War. 

The so-called "Group of Gnjilane" is believed to have kidnapped 159 Serb civilians and killed at least 51 people between June and October 1999.

The group consisted of ethnic Albanians from Preševo, Bujanovac and Medveđa, and Albanians of western Republic of Macedonia.

On 26 December 2008, Serbian authorities arrested 10 ex-KLA members from Gnjilane group suspected of torturing, looting and raping Serb and non-Serb civilians.

On 21 January 2011, the Belgrade Higher Court sentenced nine former KLA members to a total of 101 years for torturing, raping and murdering Serb and other civilians in the eastern Kosovo town of Gnjilane. The perpetrators were Ahmet Hasani, Nazif Hasani, Ferat Hajdarij, Kamber Sahiti, Burim Fazli, Faton Hajdari, Samet Hajdari, Selimon Sadiku and Agus Memisi. 

According to the indictment, Serbs were imprisoned in the basement of a local boarding school, where they were tortured, mutilated, and killed. Victims had their nails pulled out, tongues stabbed with knives, lighters hammered into skulls, and were in the end choked with plastic bags and garroted with wires. To conceal their crimes, the killers dismembered the bodies and threw them into nearby dumpsters, and in Lake Livočko.

The War Crime Chamber of the Appellate Court in Belgrade quashed the verdict on 7 December 2011 and set the case for a retrial. On 19 September 2012, the group was sentenced to a combined 116 years in prison. Meanwhile, Fazli Ajdari, Rexhep Aliu, Shaqir Shaqiri, Idriz Aliu and Ramadan Halimi, who were previously on the run, were cleared of all charges and the international warrant for their arrest was revoked. Shemsi Nuhui, who was extradited to Serbia in May 2012, was also released.

References

Kosovo Liberation Army
Massacres of Serbs
1999 murders in Serbia
Massacres in 1999